BF Antliae, or HD 86301, is a variable star in the southern constellation of Antlia. It has a baseline apparent visual magnitude of 6.32, which indicates it lies near the lower limit of visibility for faint stars. It is moving further away with a heliocentric radial velocity of +18 km/s.

This is an A-type main-sequence star with a stellar classification of A4 V that is at the end of its main sequence lifespan. It is a Delta Scuti variable that varies by 0.01 of a magnitude. These are short-period (six hours at most) pulsating stars that have been used as standard candles and as subjects to study astroseismology. Handler and Shobbrook (2002) noted that the star lies near the "hot luminous border of the δ Scuti instability strip", and it appears "multiperiodic with a time scale of 3.8–6 hours".

BF Antliae is spinning rapidly with a projected rotational velocity of 219 km/s. It has 2.41 times the mass of the Sun and is radiating 67 times the Sun's luminosity from its photosphere at an effective temperature of 7,745 K.

References

A-type main-sequence stars
Delta Scuti variables
Antlia
Durchmusterung objects
086301
048776
3933
Antliae, BF